Soursop (also called graviola, guyabano, and in Hispanic America, guanábana) is the fruit of Annona muricata, a broadleaf, flowering, evergreen tree. It is native to the tropical regions of the Americas and the Caribbean and is widely propagated.  It is in the same genus, Annona, as cherimoya and is in the Annonaceae family.

The soursop is adapted to areas of high humidity and relatively warm winters; temperatures below  will cause damage to leaves and small branches, and temperatures below  can be fatal. The fruit becomes dry and is no longer good for concentrate.

With an aroma similar to pineapple, the flavor of the fruit has been described as a combination of strawberries and apple with sour citrus flavor notes, contrasting with an underlying thick creamy texture reminiscent of banana.

Soursop is widely promoted (sometimes as "graviola") as an alternative cancer treatment, but there is no reliable medical evidence it is effective for treating cancer or any disease.

Annona muricata
Annona muricata is a species of the genus Annona of the custard apple tree family, Annonaceae, which has edible fruit.  The fruit is usually called soursop due to its slightly acidic taste when ripe.  Annona muricata is native to the Caribbean and Central America but is now widely cultivated – and in some areas, becoming invasive – in tropical and subtropical climates throughout the world, such as India.

The annona muricata fruit is generally called guanábana in Hispanic America, and the tree is a guanábano. Both tree and fruit were called  in some parts of Venezuela, but that word is currently less commonly used. It is known as sirsak in Indonesia.

Annona muricata is also the main host plant for tailed jay (Graphium agamemnon) caterpillars. They eat the leaves voraciously and usually stick under the leaves to pupate.

Description

Its young branches are hairy. They are a glossy dark green with no hairs above, and paler and minutely hairy to no hairs below.

They appear opposite from the leaves or as an extra from near the leaf stalk, each with one or two flowers, occasionally a third.

The petals are thick and yellowish. They are evenly thick, and are covered with long, slender, soft hairs externally and matted finely with soft hairs within. Inner petals are oval shaped and overlap. Margins are comparatively thin, with fine matted soft hairs on both sides. The receptacle is conical and hairy. The connective-tip terminate abruptly and anther hollows are unequal. Sepals are quite thick and do not overlap. Carpels are linear and basally growing from one base. The ovaries are covered with dense reddish brown hairs, 1-ovuled, style short and stigma truncate. Its pollen is shed as permanent tetrads.

The fruits are dark green and prickly. Their flesh is juicy, acidic, whitish and aromatic.

Distribution
It cannot stand frost. The exact origin is unknown; it is native to the tropical regions of the Americas and is widely propagated. It is an introduced species on all temperate continents, especially in subtropical regions.

Cultivation
Away from its native area, some limited production occurs as far north as southern Florida within USDA Zone 10; however, these are mostly garden plantings for local consumption. It is also grown in parts of Southeast Asia and is abundant on the Island of Mauritius. The main suppliers of the fruit are Mexico followed by Peru, Brazil, Ecuador, Guatemala, and Haiti. To aid soursop breeders and stimulate further development of genomic resources for this globally important plant family, the complete genome for Annona muricata was sequenced in 2021.

Uses 
The flesh of the fruit consists of an edible, white pulp, some fiber, and a core of indigestible black seeds. The pulp is also used to make fruit nectar, smoothies, fruit juice drinks, as well as candies, sorbets, and ice cream flavorings. Due to the fruit's widespread cultivation, its derivative products are consumed in many countries, such as Mexico, Brazil, Venezuela, Colombia, and Fiji. The seeds are normally left in the preparation, and removed while consuming, unless a blender is used for processing.

In Indonesia, dodol sirsak, a sweet, is made by boiling soursop pulp in water and adding sugar until the mixture caramelizes and hardens. Soursop is also a common ingredient for making fresh fruit juices that are sold by street food vendors. In the Philippines, it is called guyabano, derived from the Spanish guanábana, and is eaten ripe, or used to make juices, smoothies, or ice cream. Sometimes, the leaf is used in tenderizing meat. In Vietnam, this fruit is called mãng cầu Xiêm (Siamese Soursop) in the south, or mãng cầu (Soursop) in the north, and is used to make smoothies, or eaten as is. In Cambodia, this fruit is called tearb barung, literally "western custard-apple fruit." In Malaysia, it is known in Malay as durian belanda ("Dutch durian") and in East Malaysia, specifically among the Dusun people of Sabah, it is locally known as lampun. Popularly, it is eaten raw when it ripens, or used as one of the ingredients in Ais Kacang or Ais Batu Campur. Usually the fruits are taken from the tree when they mature and left to ripen in a dark corner, whereafter they will be eaten when they are fully ripe. It has a white flower with a very pleasing scent, especially in the morning. While for people in Brunei Darussalam this fruit is popularly known as "Durian Salat", widely available and easily planted.

Soursop leaves are sold and consumed in Indonesia as herbal medicine. The leaves are usually boiled to make tea.

Subspecies as synonyms
Annona muricata var. borinquensis

Nutrition 

Raw soursop is 81% water, 17% carbohydrates, 1% protein, and has negligible fat (see table). In a 100 gram reference amount, the raw fruit supplies 66 kilocalories, and contains only vitamin C as a significant amount (25%) of the Daily Value, with no other micronutrients in appreciable amounts (table).

Phytochemicals
The compound annonacin is contained in the fruit, seeds, and leaves of soursop. The leaves of Annona muricata contain annonamine, which is an aporphine-class alkaloid containing a quaternary ammonium group. The plant also contains lichexanthone, a compound in the xanthone class.

Potential neurotoxicity
The Memorial Sloan-Kettering Cancer Center cautions, "alkaloids extracted from graviola may cause neuronal dysfunction". Annonacin has been shown in laboratory research to be neurotoxic. In 2010, the French food safety agency, Agence française de sécurité sanitaire des produits de santé, concluded that "it is not possible to confirm that the observed cases of atypical Parkinson syndrome ... are linked to the consumption of Annona muricata".

False cancer treatment claims
In 2008, the Federal Trade Commission in the United States stated that use of soursop to treat cancer was "bogus", and there was "no credible scientific evidence" that the extract of soursop sold by Bioque Technologies "can prevent, cure, or treat cancer of any kind." Also in 2008, a UK court case relating to the sale of Triamazon, a soursop product, resulted in the criminal conviction of a man under the terms of the UK Cancer Act for offering to treat people for cancer. A spokesman for the council that instigated the action stated, "it is as important now as it ever was that people are protected from those peddling unproven products with spurious claims as to their effects."

The Memorial Sloan-Kettering Cancer Center and Cancer Research UK state that cancer treatment using soursop is not supported by reliable clinical evidence. According to Cancer Research UK, "Many sites on the internet advertise and promote graviola capsules as a cancer cure, but none of them are supported by any reputable scientific cancer organisations" and "there is no evidence to show that graviola works as a cure for cancer".

See also 
 Annona crassiflora
 Annona reticulata
 Atemoya
 Cherimoya
 List of unproven and disproven cancer treatments
 Sugar-apple
 Pawpaw

References

External links 

 Soursop, List of Chemicals, Dr. James Duke, USDA Phytochemical and Ethnobotanical Databases, November 2004
Morton, Julia F. (1987) Fruits of Warm Climates: Soursop

Alternative cancer treatments
Annona
Flora of Brazil
Flora of Jamaica
Hawaiian cuisine
Jamaican cuisine
Tropical fruit
Plants described in 1753
Flora without expected TNC conservation status